Shepherd Walton Clark (born March 1, 1971) is a famous American competitive figure skater and the reigning World Figure Champion of The World Figure Sport Society. In 2022, he defended his World Figure Championship title, becoming The 2022 World Figure & Fancy Skating Champion, as well as the overall World Figure & Fancy Skating Champion. Clark has a total of ten World Figure Sport world championship gold medals, and two silver medals, making him the most decorated skater in World Figure Sport history, with twelve medals in total. He is also the only skater to compete in all eight World Figure Championships, 2015–2022. Clark is the only man to defend a World Figure title, to achieve the dual Figure & Fancy title, and the first to defend the dual titles in World Figure Sport history. He is the first person, and only person, to ever win six World Figure Championships Overall Titles. 

His figure scores set a record for the highest ever in 2019, achieving seven "World Class 6" scores at the 2019 Championships in Vail. In 2020, Mr. Clark was awarded The World Figure Sport Lifetime Achievement Award, for his accomplishments in figure skating, including having performed the greatest number of figures at a world level than anyone in skating's history. The World Figure Championships trophy is the actual skating trophy that was formerly presented to The World Professional Champion. His record scoring final figure of the 2019 World Figure Championships, "Eight Eights", is on the cover of the World Figure Sport guide book published in 2020, along with an image of The 2019 World Figure Championships Men's event podium. In 2020, an emotional Shepherd Clark, was presented with The World Figure Sport Society Suzanne Shelley Clark Award, in memory of Mr. Clark's recently deceased mother, who is known to have supported her son over a lifetime. This award is presented occasionally to unusually outstanding people in the world of figure skating art. Mr. Clark had gone from his early years struggling with very weak figures, to being recognized many years later as "The King of Figures" and as a World Champion Skating Artist, due to figures and the "Fancy Skating", the original antiquated term for "figure skating", uniting Fine, Performing, Decorative, and Recording Arts, all in one historic, ancient winter activity. In 2021, Mr. Clark scored perfect World Class 6 marks from all of the judges on his Left Forward Inside Eight Figure, making him the first skater, man or woman, to achieve a perfect score on a figure. In 2021, Mr. Clark also won all 16 of the segments of the competition, a unique feat that no man, or woman, had achieved in World Figure Sport history. In 2022, Mr. Clark repeated winning all 16 segments of the 2022 World Figure & Fancy Skating Championships.

As far as mainstream figure skating goes, Clark is the 1989 World Junior silver medalist, the 1989 Nebelhorn Trophy champion, the 1994 Nations Cup silver medalist, and the 1996 Finlandia Trophy champion. He was the first skater to land the triple lutz / triple loop combination in competition. As well as being a successful figure skater, he is also a jeweled art designer and jewel historian. Mr. Clark is the only skater in the world to ever have achieved a medal in an ISU, International Skating Union World Championships level event, and a WFS, World Figure Sport event. These two events were The 1989 World Junior Championships where Mr. Clark won the silver medal, and the 2015-2021 World Figure Championships, where Mr. Clark won two silvers and eight gold medals, for a total of ten, the record. He also received a Lifetime Achievement Award from the World Figure Sport Hall of Fame at The 2020 World Figure Championships.

Figure skating career
Clark was coached by, and worked with, many of the world's most famous figure skating coaches, such as Carlo and Christa Fassi, Terri Klindworth Hooper, Don Laws, Janet Champion, Tamara Moskvia, Frank Carroll, Mary Staton, Iris Bevin, Karen Cullinan, Marcia Pearce Chaffee, Tommy McGinnis, Lorraine Borman, Cathy Casey, Phillip Mills, Trixi Schuba, Tim Wood, Lorna Brown, Paula Wagener, Gary Visconti, Lynn Gagliotti, Louis Elkin, Roseanne Wager, Alex McGowan, Evy Scotvold, Mary Scotvold, Slavka Button and Diane Agle in Boston, Massachusetts. In December 1987, at the age of sixteen, he placed 4th at the 1988 World Junior Figure Skating Championships, and he won the silver medal at the 1989 Junior Worlds the following year. He won silver at the 1994 Nations Cup, placing second to Elvis Stojko, who was the reigning ISU World Figure Skating Champion.

In 1996, he became the Finlandia Trophy champion, the first American ever to win this trophy. He is also the 1998 U.S. national pewter medalist (4th place) and won seven sectional titles. He was the 1998 US Olympic Team Alternate (reserve skater), and the 1998 and 1999 World Figure Skating Team Alternate. In 1999, Clark placed 6th at the first Four Continents Championships in Halifax, Nova Scotia; this was the highest U.S. finish in the men's event that year.

From 2015–2020, Clark participated in the annual World Figure Championship, hosted by the World Figure Sport Society. These events are known to include the most difficult of Olympic figures, World Championship figures, and creative figures of skating's past, while providing a stage for sculptural artistic skating, where edge quality and positions are valued above numbers of rotations on skating jumps. Men's special figures were contested in 1908 at the Summer Olympic Games in London, the first time that figure skating had ever been included in the Olympics. Nikolai Panin of the Russian Empire won the Olympic gold medal that year, becoming the first Winter Olympic sport champion. In 2019, Mr. Clark earned the highest score in World Figure Sport history, the highest, "World Class 6", essentially a perfect mark in World Figure Sport, and which Mr. Clark is the only skater to have merited from 2015 through the 2022 World Figure & Fancy Skating Championships.

In August 2015, and December 2016, Clark won the silver medal in men's figures at the World Figure Championship & Figure Festival in Lake Placid, New York. He proceeded to win the gold medal in 2017, 2018, and 2019, 2020, 2021, and 2022 setting a world record by winning a total of six World Figure & Fancy Skating medals (two silver and six gold). In 2017, the gold medal was presented to him by Dorothy Hamill, the 1976 US National, Olympic, and World Champion. Clark is also the 2017 World Fancy Skating Champion, which is a blend of figure composition and artistic free skating. His gold medal was presented by Barbara Wagner, the 1960 Olympic Pairs Figure Skating Champion. In 2019, Shepherd Clark's gold medal was presented by Donald Jackson, of Canada, a World Champion and the first skater to land the Triple Lutz jump. Mr. Clark is currently the most decorated skater of Figures and Fancy skating on record with the World Figure Sport Society, and he is the first skater who has earned the dual title of "World Figure & Fancy Skating Champion".

Other appearances
Clark has appeared in motion pictures such as "Ice Pawn", produced in 1990, books such as Zero Tollerance by Toller Cranston, and The Sweater book by Stephen Mosher, an assemblage of Hollywood, art, and entertainment personalities from around the world, as well as the biography of Trixi Schuba, the 1972 Olympic Figure Skating Champion known for her figure mastery. He appears in Christine Brennan's Little Girls In Pretty Boxes, referenced as a jewelry designer in a meeting at The Olympic Training Center. Clark has also appeared in many TV broadcasts of figure skating competitions and exhibitions.

Personal life
Clark is an artist of jewel design and of jeweled art objects, and also a jewel historian. In 2003, Clark is believed to have been the first skater to wear real gemstones on a skating costume, as a way to promote his jewelry designing. He is an entrepreneur in various industries, and known for working with charities and ministries. He is also known to be a cat lover; he has used cats in his promotional media, and has found adoption homes for rescued cats and kittens.

In 2017, Shepherd Clark founded a museum that seeks art talent from around the world, including figure skating artists, and awards them based upon relevance, originality, and mastery. In 2017, he completed a work of art entitled "The Impossible Dream", which was inspired by the blue of Trixi Schuba's Olympic skating costume, and her music choice. This work of art emphasizes the value and metaphoric importance of the circle as a shape representing life coming "full circle" when one trusts God.

Programs

Competitive highlights
GP: Champions Series / Grand Prix

References

External links
 Figure skating corner profile
 Tracings.net profile

American male single skaters
1971 births
Sportspeople from Atlanta
Living people
World Junior Figure Skating Championships medalists